The Cycling at the 1973 Southeast Asian Peninsular Games were held at the Farrer Park and Sembawang, Singapore. Cycling events was held between 2 September to 8 September.

Medal summary

Men

Medal table

References

1973 Southeast Asian Peninsular Games
Southeast Asian Games
1973
1973 in track cycling